Thoracodorsal may refer to:
Thoracodorsal nerve
Thoracodorsal artery